57 Persei, or m Persei, is a suspected triple star system in the northern constellation of Perseus. It is at the lower limit of visibility to the naked eye, having a combined apparent visual magnitude of 6.08.

The primary member, 57 Persei, is a magnitude 6.18, yellow-white hued F-type main-sequence star with a stellar classification of F0 V, indicating it is generating energy by fusing its core hydrogen. It is an estimated 1.6 billion years old and is spinning with a projected rotational velocity of 90 km/s.

An unseen companion has been identified via slight changes to the proper motion of the primary. The third possible member of the system, designated component B, is a magnitude 6.87 F-type star at an angular separation of 120.13 arc seconds. This star has a different parallax and space velocity than the primary, so it may just be a wide visual companion. There are three other nearby visual companions that are not physically associated with the 57 Persei system.

References

F-type main-sequence stars
Triple star systems
Perseus (constellation)
Persei, m
Persei, 57
Durchmusterung objects
028704
021242
1434
A-type main-sequence stars